Ludovic Mrazec (July 17, 1867 in Craiova – June 9, 1944 in Bucharest) was a Romanian geologist and member of the Romanian Academy. He introduced the term diapir that denotes a type of intrusion in which a more mobile and ductily deformable material is forced into brittle overlying rocks. The phenomenon of "diapirism" allows rock salt to provide an effective trap for hydrocarbon deposits. In this way, Ludovic Mrazec explained the distribution of hydrocarbon accumulations in the Neogene Carpathian. Diapirism is commonly used as a basic concept in geological survey as well as in Planetary science.

References

1867 births
1944 deaths
People from Craiova
Romanian people of Czech descent
Romanian geologists
Presidents of the Romanian Academy
Romanian Ministers of Industry and Commerce